The 1983 Ugandan Super League was the 16th season of the official Ugandan football championship, the top-level football league of Uganda.

Overview
The 1983 Uganda Super League was contested by 16 teams and was won by Kampala City Council FC, while Mbarara, Tobacco and Spinners were relegated.

League standings

Leading goalscorer
The top goalscorer in the 1983 season was Issa Ssekatawa of Express FC with 21 goals.

References

External links
Uganda - List of Champions - RSSSF (Hans Schöggl)
Ugandan Football League Tables - League321.com

Ugandan Super League seasons
Uganda
Uganda
1